The 2020 Green Party of England and Wales leadership election took place in August 2020 to determine the leader of the Green Party of England and Wales, while an election for the party's deputy leader also took place simultaneously. Jonathan Bartley and Siân Berry, who were elected on a joint ticket in 2018, were re-elected as co-leaders while Amelia Womack was re-elected as the party's deputy leader.

Background 
Prior to 2008, the Green Party elected spokespeople called principal speakers instead of leaders. After a rule change, the party adopted a system of electing a leader or co-leaders every two years. If there are two co-leaders, a single deputy will be elected whereas if there is a single leader there are two deputies. In either case, the election is subject to the party's gender-balancing rules. The election was held under the instant-runoff voting electoral system, with voters able to select different preferences for each candidate.

Campaign

Leadership 
The incumbent co-leaders, Jonathan Bartley and Siân Berry, stood for re-election. Bartley was a Lambeth councillor and Berry was a London Assembly Member and the party's candidate for the 2021 London mayoral election.

Shahrar Ali, the party's home affairs spokesperson who had been one of the party's deputy leaders from 2014 to 2016, ran for the leadership. He had previously run against Bartley and Berry in 2018.

One of the party's councillors in Solihull, the mixed martial artist Rosi Sexton, campaigned for the leadership as an "outsider". She said she wanted to focus on the party's electoral strategy and policy development processes.

Deputy leadership 
Amelia Womack was first elected as the party's deputy leader in 2014 and was re-elected in each subsequent election.

Cleo Lake, a Bristol councillor for the party since 2016, contested the deputy leadership election saying she wanted to inspire more activists into politics. The writer and campaigner Tom Pashy, Nick Humberstone, and Andrea Carey Fuller also sought election as deputy leader.

Timeline

June
 1 June: Nominations open at 10am
 30 June: Nominations close at 12pm

August
 3 August: Online voting opens at 10am
 31 August: Online voting closes at 10pm

September
 9 September: Results announced

Candidates

Leader

Deputy leader

Declined and withdrawn 

The former MEPs Alex Phillips and Magid Magid were speculated as potential leadership candidates but chose not to run. The former Parliamentary candidate James Booth initially stood as a deputy leadership candidate, but withdrew.

Results

Leader 

Jonathan Bartley and Siân Berry were re-elected as co-leaders in the second round.

Deputy leader 

Amelia Womack was re-elected as deputy leader in the second round.

Aftermath 
The turnout was the lowest for one of the party's leadership elections since Natalie Bennett's unopposed re-election in 2014. The re-elected co-leaders, Bartley and Berry, said they wanted to make gains in the upcoming 2021 United Kingdom local elections and promised to make the party the "main opposition" to the Conservative government.

References 

Green Party of England and Wales leadership
Green Party of England and Wales leadership elections
Green Party of England and Wales leadership election
Green Party of England and Wales leadership election
Green Party of England and Wales leadership election, 2020